Destruction (2019) was a series of professional wrestling events promoted by New Japan Pro-Wrestling (NJPW). In 2019, NJPW promoted three events: Destruction in Beppu on September 15, Destruction in Kagoshima on September 16 and Destruction in Kobe on September 22. These were events twenty-one to twenty-three in the Destruction chronology.

Production

Background
2019 is the fourth consecutive year in which NJPW hold three events under the Destruction name. From 2007 to 2013 NJPW held one event per year, expanding to two shows in 2014 and to three shows in 2016.

Storylines
The three Destruction events featured nine professional wrestling matches each that involved different wrestlers from pre-existing scripted feuds and storylines. Wrestlers portray villains, heroes, or less distinguishable characters in the scripted events that build tension and culminate in a wrestling match or series of matches.

Results

Destruction in Beppu

Destruction in Kagoshima

Destruction in Kobe

References

External links
The official New Japan Pro-Wrestling English language website

2019 in professional wrestling
September 2019 events in Japan
NJPW Destruction